4-Nitrobenzaldehyde is an organic aromatic compound containing a nitro group para-substituted to an aldehyde.

Nitrobenzyldiacetate is obtained by the reaction of 4-nitrotoluene and chromium(VI) oxide in acetic anhydride. 4-Nitrobenzaldehyde is obtained by hydrolysis by sulfuric acid in ethanol.

References

Benzaldehydes
Nitrobenzenes